The women's 5000 metres walk event at the 1992 World Junior Championships in Athletics was held in Seoul, South Korea, at Olympic Stadium on 20 September.

Medalists

Results

Final
20 September

Participation
According to an unofficial count, 35 athletes from 24 countries participated in the event.

References

5000 metres walk
Racewalking at the World Athletics U20 Championships